Saux or Le Saux may refer to:

People
 Graeme Le Saux (born 1968), Jèrriais football pundit and former player
 Henri Le Saux (1910–1973), French monk
 Stephen Saux (born 1972), American actor, writer, cinematographer, and short film producer
 Yorick Le Saux (born 1968), American cinematographer
 Yves Le Saux (born 1960), French prelate of the Catholic Church

Places
 Saux, Lot, France, a former commune
 Saux-et-Pomarède, Haute-Garonne, France, a commune